Kirill II or Cyril II (died 6 December 1281) was the metropolitan of Kiev from 1242 until his death. He was close to the khan of the Golden Horde, Mengu-Timur.

Russian chronicles record that King Mengu-Timur and Metropolitan Kirill sent Sarai Bishop Theognostus to the Emperor Michael VIII and the Patriarch of Constantinople as their joint envoy with letters and gifts from each of them. This embassy was probably held around 1278, as Theognostus returned to Sarai in 1279.

It appears that relations with Egypt were also discussed by Theognostus with the emperor and the patriarch. Anyway, at about the same time, Meng-Timur tried to establish direct diplomatic ties with Egypt through Constantinople.

Prior to 1251 was close to Prince Daniel of Galicia (Danylo Halytskyi).

In 1246 on the road to Nicaea he was negotiating with the Hungarian King Bela IV, which resulted in the marriage of a Hungarian princess to Daniel Galitsky.

Around 1251 Kirill left Daniel Galitsky, who in 1254 received the royal crown from the Pope.

In 1251, he went to Novgorod, where he first met with Alexander Nevsky.

Since 1251 Kirill almost continuously resided in the north-east of Russia, working closely with Prince Alexander Nevsky, constantly traveling around the country.

In 1252, Alexander Nevsky became a ruler of Vladimir instead of his brother Andrew Yaroslavich, and the Metropolitan solemnly met Alexander Nevsky, who returned from the Horde, and supported his reign. Prince Alexander Nevsky and Kirill chose to recognise Mongol domination, and opposed Western Catholic expansion.

Church
Around 1252 Cyril received a charter from Batu Khan, which guaranteed the inviolability of the Orthodox Church. A charter of 1267, issued by Berke Khan, has been authentically preserved. In 1258 he founded the bishopric in Tver. In 1261, with the assistance of Alexander Nevsky, an Orthodox diocese was founded in Sarai. In 1274 a council of bishops of the Russian Church was held in Vladimir, with the aim to order and restore the ecclesiastical legislation.

In 1279, Khan Meng-Timur issued a charter that defended the faith and the sanctity of the rights of clergy from abuse by Mongol officials. Kirill appointed bishops to Vladimir, Rostov and Sarai.

Kirill died in Pereslavl-Zalessky, Grand Duchy of Vladimir and Suzdal. At first his body was moved to Vladimir, but later to Kiev where he was buried on a territory of the Sophia Cathedral compound.

Further reading
 Cherepnin, L.V. Chronicler of Daniel of Galicia (Летописец Даниила Галицкого). "Istoricheskie zapiski", #12. 1941.
 Fuhrmann, Joseph T. "Metropolitan Cyril II (1242–1281) and the Politics of Accommodation". Jahrbücher für Geschichte Osteuropas, Neue Folge, 24, 2 (1976), pp. 161–172. 
 Shchapov, J.N. State and church in the Old Ruthenia 10-13th centuries (Государство и церковь Древней Руси Х–XIII вв). Moscow 1989
 Galician-Volhynian chronicles. Research. Text. Comments (Галицько-Волинський літопис. Дослідження. Текст. Коментар). Kiev 2002

External links
 Kotlyar, M.F. Kyrylo II. Encyclopedia of History of Ukraine.

Metropolitans of Kiev and all Rus' (988–1441)
Year of birth unknown
1281 deaths
Russian saints of the Eastern Orthodox Church
Burials at Saint Sophia Cathedral, Kyiv